Herbert Edward Dodkins (20 December 1929 – 18 January 2014) was an English footballer who represented Great Britain at the 1956 Summer Olympics. Dodkins played as an amateur for Ilford.

References

1929 births
2014 deaths
English footballers
Ilford F.C. players
Footballers at the 1956 Summer Olympics
Olympic footballers of Great Britain
Association football midfielders
People from Epping